Draco modiglianii, the lined flying dragon, is a species of agamid lizard. It is found in Indonesia.

References

Draco (genus)
Reptiles of Indonesia
Reptiles described in 1892
Taxa named by Decio Vinciguerra